Glycine N-phenylacetyltransferase (arylacetyl-CoA N-acyltransferase, arylacetyltransferase, GAT (gene)) is an enzyme with systematic name phenylacetyl-CoA:glycine N-phenylacetyltransferase. This enzyme catalyses the following chemical reaction

 phenylacetyl-CoA + glycine  CoA + phenylacetylglycine

This enzyme was purified from bovine liver mitochondria.

References

External links 
 

EC 2.3.1